Reginald Southey (15 September 1835 – 8 November 1899) was an English physician and inventor of Southey's cannula or tube, a type of trocar used for draining oedema of the limbs.

Life
Southey was a nephew of Romantic poet Robert Southey, and the fifth son of medical doctor Henry Herbert Southey. A graduate of Christ Church, Oxford, he studied medicine at St Bartholomew's Hospital before travelling the world. He went on to serve as a member of the Lunacy Commission from 1883 until 1898. He was Gulstonian Lecturer in 1867.

He was a lifelong friend of Charles Lutwidge Dodgson ('Lewis Carroll'), and encouraged Dodgson to take up photography.

References

External links

Biography
Reginald Southey and Skeletons, June 1857, photograph by Charles Dodgson

19th-century English medical doctors
Alumni of the Medical College of St Bartholomew's Hospital
Alumni of Christ Church, Oxford
1835 births
1899 deaths